The World Video Game Hall of Fame is an international hall of fame that opened on June 4, 2015. It is located in The National Museum of Play's eGameRevolution exhibit; the hall's administration is overseen by The Strong and the International Center for the History of Electronic Games. The World Video Game Hall of Fame's creator is Jon-Paul C. Dyson, who is The Strong's Vice President for Exhibit Research and Development and the Director of the International Center for the History of Electronic Games.

Video games become eligible for the World Video Game Hall of Fame by meeting four basic criteria: 
 Icon Status – is widely recognized and remembered
 Longevity – is more than a passing fad and has enjoyed popularity over time
 Geographical Reach – meets the above criteria across international boundaries
 Influence – has exerted significant influence on the design and development of other games, on other forms of entertainment, or on popular culture and society in general.

Class of 2015
Nominations from the general public were accepted from February 17, 2015 through March 31, 2015. The finalists were chosen by an internal committee, while an international selection committee made up of journalists, scholars, and other individuals choose the inaugural inductees to the hall of fame. The finalists were (inaugural inductees in bold):
 New finalists for 2015:
 Angry Birds (2009)
 Doom (1993)
 FIFA International Soccer (1993)
 The Legend of Zelda (1986)
 Minecraft (2011)
 The Oregon Trail (1971)
 Pac-Man (1980)
 Pong (1972)
 Pokémon Red and Blue (1996)
 The Sims (2000)
 Sonic the Hedgehog (1991)
 Space Invaders (1978)
 Super Mario Bros. (1985)
 Tetris (1984)
 World of Warcraft (2004)

Class of 2016
Nominations were again accepted from the public. The finalists were announced on March 19, 2016, and the inductees were announced on May 5, 2016. The finalists were (with inductees in bold):
 Hold-over finalists:
 The Legend of Zelda (1986)
 The Oregon Trail (1971)
 The Sims (2000)
 Sonic the Hedgehog (1991)
 Space Invaders (1978)
 Minecraft (2011)
 Pokémon Red and Green (or Blue) (1996)
 New finalists for 2016:
 Grand Theft Auto III (2001)
 Elite (1984)
 Final Fantasy (1987)
 John Madden Football (1990)
 Nürburgring (1976)
 Sid Meier's Civilization (1991)
 Street Fighter II: The World Warrior (1991)
 Tomb Raider (1996)

Class of 2017
Nominations were again accepted online from the public. The finalists were announced on March 16, 2017, and the inductees were announced on May 4, 2017. The finalists were (with inductees in bold):
 Hold-over finalists:
 Pokémon Red and Green (or Blue) (1996)
 Street Fighter II: The World Warrior (1991)
 Tomb Raider (1996)
 New finalists for 2017:
 Donkey Kong (1981)
 Halo: Combat Evolved (2001)
 Final Fantasy VII (1997)
 Microsoft Solitaire (1990)
 Mortal Kombat (1992)
 Myst (1993)
 Portal (2007)
 Resident Evil (1996)
 Wii Sports (2006)

Class of 2018
Nominations were once again accepted online from the public. The finalists were announced on March 27, 2018. The finalists are:
 Hold-over finalists:
 Final Fantasy VII (1997)
 John Madden Football (1990)
 Minecraft (2011)
 Tomb Raider (1996)
 New finalists for 2018:
 Spacewar! (1962)
 Asteroids (1979)
 Call of Duty (2003)
 Dance Dance Revolution (1998)
 Half-Life (1998)
 King's Quest (1984)
 Metroid (1986)
 Ms. Pac-Man (1982)

Class of 2019
The inductees in 2019 are marked in bold below.
 Hold-over finalists:
 Dance Dance Revolution (1998)
 Half-Life (1998) Microsoft Solitaire (1990)
 Mortal Kombat (1992)
 Myst (1993)
 Sid Meier's Civilization (1991)
 New finalists for 2019:
 Candy Crush (2012)
 Centipede (1981)
 Colossal Cave Adventure (1976)
 NBA 2K (1999)
 Super Mario Kart (1992)
 Super Smash Bros. Melee (2001)

Class of 2020
Finalists for consideration were announced on March 19, 2020. On June 18, 2020, the 2020 inductees were announced. The finalists were (inductees marked in bold):
 Hold-over finalists:
 Centipede (1981)
 King's Quest (1984)
 Minecraft (2011)
 Super Smash Bros. Melee (2001)
 New finalists for 2020:
 Bejeweled (2001)
 Frogger (1981)
 GoldenEye 007 (1997)
 Guitar Hero (2005)
 NBA Jam (1993)
 Nokia Snake (1997)
 Uncharted 2: Among Thieves (2009)
 Where in the World Is Carmen Sandiego? (1985)

Class of 2021
The following finalists were announced on March 18, 2021, with the inductees being revealed on May 6, 2021.
The finalists are:
 Hold-over finalists:
 Call of Duty (2003)
 FIFA International Soccer (1993)
 Guitar Hero (2005)
 Portal (2007)
 Where in the World Is Carmen Sandiego? (1985)
 New finalists for 2021:
 Animal Crossing (2001)
 FarmVille (2009)
 Mattel Football (1977)
 Microsoft Flight Simulator (1982)
 Pole Position (1982)
 StarCraft (1998)
 Tron (1982)

Class of 2022

The finalists for the class of 2022 were announced on March 17,
and the inductees were revealed on May 5.
 Hold-over finalists:
 Candy Crush (2012)
 Dance Dance Revolution (1998)
 Ms. Pac-Man (1982)
 NBA Jam (1993)
 Resident Evil (1996)
 Sid Meier's Civilization (1991)
 New finalists for 2022:
 Assassin's Creed (2007)
 The Legend of Zelda: Ocarina of Time (1998)
 Microsoft Minesweeper (1990)
 PaRappa the Rapper (1996)
 Rogue (1980)
 Words with Friends (2009)

 Class of 2023 
The finalists for the class of 2023 were announced on March 15.
 Hold-over finalists:
 Angry Birds (2009)
 FIFA International Soccer (1993)
 GoldenEye 007 (1997)
 NBA 2K (1999)
 Wii Sports (2006)
 New finalists for 2023:
 Age of Empires (1997)
 Barbie Fashion Designer (1996)
 Call of Duty 4: Modern Warfare (2007)
 Computer Space (1971)
 The Last of Us (2013)
 Quake (1996)
 Wizardry'' (1981)

References

External links
World Video Game Hall of Fame

2015 establishments in New York (state)
Halls of fame in New York (state)
Museums established in 2015
Museums in Rochester, New York
Video game awards